Mehmet Polat (born 8 June 1978 in Gaziantep) is a Turkish footballer who last played for Mersin İdmanyurdu. He is a versatile central defender who can also play as rightback or defensive midfielder. He was capped four times for Turkey. He spent 2002-03 season on loan at Galatasaray. Once considered one of the best defenders of Turkey, he could not live up to those predictions. He stands at 1.78 m and wears the jersey number 27, which is also the license plate for Gaziantep.

Transferred to Gençlerbirliği during the January transfer window of the 2008-2009 Season.

External links
 Gençlerbirliği Site Profile
 Profile at TFF.org 
 
 Profile at footballstats.metro.co.uk
 Official website of Binbir Gece

1978 births
Living people
Turkish footballers
Turkey international footballers
Gaziantepspor footballers
Samsunspor footballers
Kardemir Karabükspor footballers
Çaykur Rizespor footballers
Galatasaray S.K. footballers
Gençlerbirliği S.K. footballers
Mersin İdman Yurdu footballers
Sportspeople from Gaziantep
Süper Lig players
Turkey under-21 international footballers
Association football midfielders
Association football defenders